Simmons Peak is a mountain, in the Tuolumne Meadows region of Yosemite National Park. It is a few miles north of Mount Lyell.

Simmons Peak is the 12th-highest mountain in Yosemite, if not often climbed, partially due to its not being on the Sierra Club's Sierra Peaks Section SPS List.

Near to Simmons Peak

All of the following are near, to Simmons Peak:

References

External links and references

 Mentions the first ascent, by non-Indian climbers
 One YouTube, Simmon's Peak Yosemite
 Another YouTube, the view from the summit

Mountains of Yosemite National Park
Mountains of Madera County, California
Mountains of Tuolumne County, California